Kwok Kee Chan from the Chan Technologies Inc., Brampton, Ontario, Canada, was named Fellow of the Institute of Electrical and Electronics Engineers (IEEE) in 2013 for development of planar lens beamforming networks and broadband antennas.

References

External links
 IEEE Bio

Fellow Members of the IEEE
Living people
Year of birth missing (living people)
Place of birth missing (living people)